Paul Anthony (George) Rendall (born London) is a former English rugby union player. He played as a prop.

Rendall played for London Wasps.

He had 28 caps for England, from 1984, when he was already 30 years old, to 1991, without ever scoring. He played at the Five Nations Championship for 6 seasons, in 1984, 1986, 1987, 1988, 1989 and 1990. He played at the 1987 Rugby World Cup, in three games, and at the 1991 Rugby World Cup, in one game. That would be his farewell for the national team, aged 37 years old.

External links
Paul Rendall Biography at Sporting Heroes

1954 births
Living people
English rugby union players
England international rugby union players
Rugby union players from London
Rugby union props
Wasps RFC players